Heinrich E. M. Schulz (1859-1918) was a German entomologist.

Heinrich Schulz was an insect dealer in Hamburg. The dealership was named "Entomologisch Institut Hamburg" at  Hamburg 22, Hamburgerstrasse 45. Another address for Schhulz is Wohldorferstrass 10, Hamburg. In 1900 he purchased the remaining stock of Insekten-Händlers A. J. Speyer based in Hamburg-Altona

References
 Groll, E. K. (Hrsg.): Biografien der Entomologen der Welt : Datenbank. Version 4.15 : Senckenberg Deutsches Entomologisches Institut, 2010 

German entomologists
1859 births
1918 deaths